Theodemir or Thiudimer was king of the Ostrogoths of the Amal Dynasty, and father of Theoderic the Great. He had two "brothers" (actually brothers-in-law) named Valamir and Videmir. Theodemir was Arian, while his wife Erelieva was Catholic and took the Roman Christian name Eusebia upon her baptism. He took over the three Pannonian Goth reigns after the death of Widimir, ruled jointly with his brothers-in-law as a vassal of Attila the Hun. The reason is probably that this relatively long reign of the Ostrogoths in Pannonia, while his elder brother Thiudimir lasted only for four years on the throne, followed by Theoderic, and firstly inherited, the heirless, Walamir's part of the kingdom.  He was married to Erelieva, with whom he had two children: Theoderic (454–526) and Amalafrida. When Theodemir died in 475, Theoderic succeeded him as king.

References

475 deaths
Ostrogothic kings
Gothic warriors
Amali dynasty
Huns
5th-century Arian Christians
5th-century monarchs in Europe
Year of birth unknown
5th-century Ostrogothic people